The Anglican Diocese of Yewa is one of 13 within the Anglican Province of Lagos, itself one of 14 provinces within the Church of Nigeria. The current bishop is the Rt. Michael Adebayo Oluwarohunbi.

Notes

Church of Nigeria dioceses
Dioceses of the Province of Lagos